Wonder Teacher is a 2015–2016 Thai television series starring Udomnak Kerttisak, Vichayut Limratanamongkol (Best), Pumipat Paiboon (Prame), Chawinroj Likitcharoensakul (Fame) and Akeburud Sophon (Suice).

Produced by GMMTV together with Sea Studio, the series was one of the two television series announced by GMMTV on 25 August 2015 along with Room Alone 2. It premiered on One31 on 3 October 2015, airing on Saturdays at 10:00 ICT. The series concluded on 12 March 2016.

Cast and characters 
Below are the cast of the series:

Main 
 Udomnak Kerttisak as Teacher Asanee

Supporting 
 Oranicha Krinchai (Proud) as Teacher Ple
 Acharanat Ariyaritwikol (Nott) as Teacher Thas
 Daniela Marisa Kaapro as Prim
 Pumipat Paiboon (Prame) as Richter
 Vichayut Limratanamongkol (Best) as Typhoon
 Akeburud Sophon (Suice) as Isaac
 Sutthipha Kongnawdee (Noon) as Pudthan
 Chawinroj Likitcharoensakul (Fame) as Phatra
 Tytan Teepprasan as Sharp
 Korapat Kirdpan (Nanon) as Book
 Apichaya Saejung (Ciize) as Cherry

Guest role 
 Sarunchana Apisamaimongkol (Aye) as Marry, Typhoon's sister
 Veerakaarn Nuchanart (Puaen) (Ep. 8)

References

External links 
 GMMTV

Television series by GMMTV
Thai romance television series
Thai drama television series
2015 Thai television series debuts
2016 Thai television series endings
One 31 original programming